Trans Bodies, Trans Selves: A Resource for the Transgender Community is a 2014 non-fiction book published by Oxford University Press. Edited by psychiatrist Laura Erickson-Schroth, it covers health and wellness for transgender and gender non-conforming people.
 It was a 27th Lambda Literary Awards finalist in the Transgender Non-Fiction category and won a 2015 Achievement Award from GLMA: Healthcare Professionals for LGBT Equality.

Production
The project was inspired by the women's health book Our Bodies, Ourselves. The editor put out a call for submissions in 2011. Each section was written under the guidance of expert advisors. The foreword is by author Jennifer Finney Boylan.

Reception
The book received positive reviews from the gender and sexuality scholar Cael M. Keegan in Genders, the children's book author Kyle Lukoff in the American Library Association's GLBT Reviews blog, and the medical doctor Henry H. Ng in LGBT Health. It also received positive coverage in the mainstream press. Jessica Grose wrote in New Republic that the anthology is "brimming with straightforward information about living a life as a gender-nonconforming person in the United States." It was named to several top-ten lists for 2014.

References

External links
 Official website
 Trans Bodies, Trans Selves via Oxford University Press

English-language books
2014 non-fiction books
Transgender non-fiction books
2010s LGBT literature
LGBT literature in the United States
Oxford University Press books